Belgaum Vidhana Sabha seat was part of the Karnataka state assembly in India, and part of Belgaum Lok Sabha seat. The seat ceased to exist after the assembly seats' boundary was redrawn in 2008. Now the city's constituencies are Belgaum Dakshin, Belgaum Uttar, and Belgaum Rural.

When the states of Maharashtra and Karnataka were created in 1960 on linguistic lines, Belgaum district was included in Karnataka. This decision was opposed by Marathi speaking people in the district, who argued they were in majority. Maharashtra Ekikaran Samiti was formed to fight for the cause, supported mostly by left-wing socialists in Maharashtra but not by right-wing Hindu organizations. This Samiti was very powerful in local politics for many decades. Its leading members like Balkrishna Sunthankar and Bhimrao Sayanak represented Belgaum seat for many years. But after the first batch of veterans got old, the Samiti lost its steam.

Members of Assembly 
 1962: Three candidates were elected from Belgaum, all of them from MES.  1) Balkrishna Sunthankar, 2) Vitthal Patil, and 3) Nagendra Samaji.
 1967: Balwant Bhimarao Sayanak (Independent / Activist of Maharashtra Ekikaran Samiti) 
 1972: Sw. B. Annappa (IND)
 1978: Sayanak, Balwant Bhimrao (Independent / MES)
 1983: Rajabhau Mane (Ind / MES)
 1985: Rajabhau Mane (Ind / MES)
 1989: Bapusaheb Raosaheb Mahagaonkar (IND / MES)
 1994: Narayan Tarale (Ind / MES) defeated Anil Potdar (Ind)
 2004: Ramesh Kudachi (Congress)
 2009 onwards : Seat does not exist.

Election results

1962 Election 
 Three candidates were elected from Belgaum.
 Balkrishna Rangarao Sunthankar (MES) 27,643 defeated  Sidaram Basappa Kanabargi (INC) 13,614 votes
 Vithal Seetaram Patil (MES) 17,778 defeated  Vithal Kallojirao Patil (INC) 13,312 votes 
 Nagendra Omanna Samaji (MES) 18,505 defeated Chandrappa Lingapa Pattanshetti (Indian National Congress) 17,592 votes

1967 Election 
 S. B. Bhimarao (IND) 27,818 votes 
 P. B. Bharmagauda (INC)  24,224 votes

1972 Election 
 Sw. B. Annappa (IND) 24,814 votes 
 P. R. Bhimarao (NCO)  13,783 votes

1978 Election 
 Sayanak Balwant Bhimrao (IND / MES) 39,736 votes
 Naghnoor M. N. (IND) 27,720 votes

1989 Election 
 Bapusaheb Raosaheb Mahagaonkar (IND / MES) : 35,196 votes
 Potdar Anil Mohan (JNP(JP)) : 29,809 votes

2004 Election 
 Kudachi Ramesh Laxman (INC)  32,198 votes 
 Vilas Ramachandra Pawar (BJP) 31,181 votes

See also 
 Belagavi District
 List of constituencies of Karnataka Legislative Assembly

References 

Former assembly constituencies of Karnataka